XHTUMI-FM (La Voz de la Sierra Oriente – "The Voice of the Eastern Mountains") is an indigenous community radio station that broadcasts in Spanish, Mazahua and Otomi from El Malacate, municipality of Tuxpan, in the Mexican state of Michoacán. It is run by the Cultural Indigenist Broadcasting System (SRCI) of the National Commission for the Development of Indigenous Peoples (CDI).

History
XETUMI-AM 1010 came to air on March 12, 1998.

XETUMI was authorized in June 2012 move to FM as XHTUMI-FM 107.9. The AM station was reauthorized under a separate concession as XETUX-AM 1010.

External links
XHTUMI website

References

Mazahua-language radio stations
Otomi-language radio stations
Sistema de Radiodifusoras Culturales Indígenas
Radio stations in Michoacán

Radio stations established in 1998